John Cuthbert Morley (28 July 1909 – 7 March 1972) was a Welsh international rugby wing who played rugby union for Newport and rugby league with Wigan. He won 14 caps for Wales in union, and five caps for Wales in rugby league, and was the first player to tour Australia and New Zealand for both union, and league British teams.

Morley, although mainly a wing player was often used as a utility back, and was known for his incredible pace and ability to change direction at speed. He was an intelligent but unorthodox player.

Club career
Morley first represented Wales as a schoolboy, and after leaving Newport Municipal Secondary School he joined Newport. In his first season with the club he scored 29 tries, and by 1931 was captain of the senior Newport team, at the age of 21 he was the youngest player to be given the honour. He captained Newport against the touring South Africans at Rodney Parade on 8 October 1931, and set up Ken Richards for a try after a typical zigzag run. The South Africans took note of Morley and attempted to ensure he wasn't given the space to run at them for the rest of the game. In August 1932 he switched to rugby league, leaving Newport for Wigan.

Championship final appearances
Jack Morley played , i.e. number 2, and scored a try in Wigan's 15–3 victory over Salford in the Championship Final during the 1933–34 season at Wilderspool Stadium, Warrington on Saturday 28 April 1934 .

County Cup Final appearances
Jack Morley played , i.e. number 2, in Wigan's 10–7 victory over Salford in the 1938–39 Lancashire County Cup Final during the 1938–39 season at Station Road, Swinton on Saturday 22 October 1938.

Notable tour matches
Jack Morley played , i.e. number 2, and scored 2-tries in Wigan's 30–27 victory over France at Central Park, Wigan, on Saturday 10 March 1934.

International career
Morley was first capped for Wales against England on 19 January 1929 and although he finished on the losing side he did manage to score a try on his début, when he received the ball forty yards out, broke infield and crossed wide, after cutting back inside to score. He retained his place and played in the remaining three games of the Championship. After playing in two matches of the 1930 tournament, he played in all four matches of Wales's Championship winning 1932 campaign. Morley scored in all but one of the matches, surprisingly the game he failed to score was against France, when Wales were rampant and his team mates scored seven tries. Morley was capped 14 times for Wales and his final game was against Ireland at the Cardiff Arms Park in 1932. He would probably have been chosen for future teams as he was still a young exciting player, but his decision to join a professional league side made him ineligible for future Welsh games.

International matches played under union code
Wales
 1929, 1930, 1931, 1932
 1929, 1931
 1929, 1930, 1931, 1932
 1929, 1931, 1932
 1931

British Lions
 New Zealand 1930, 1930, 1930

International matches played under league code
Great Britain
 1936, 1937
Wales
 1932, 1936
 1935, 1935
 1933

References

Bibliography

External links
Statistics at wigan.rlfans.com

1909 births
1972 deaths
British & Irish Lions rugby union players from Wales
Crawshays RFC players
Dual-code rugby internationals
England national rugby league team players
Great Britain national rugby league team players
Newport RFC players
Rugby union players from Newport, Wales
Rugby league wingers
Rugby union centres
Wales international rugby union players
Wales national rugby league team players
Welsh rugby league players
Welsh rugby union players
Wigan Warriors players
Rugby league players from Newport, Wales